Andrew Turnbull may refer to:

People
 Andrew Turnbull (colonist) (1718–1792), early colonizer of Florida
 Andrew Turnbull, Baron Turnbull (born 1945), head of the British Civil Service and Cabinet Secretary
 Andrew Turnbull (rugby union) (born 1982), Scottish rugby union player
 Andrew B. Turnbull (1884–1960), first president of the Green Bay Packers and newspaper owner
 Drew Turnbull (1930–2012), Scottish rugby union and rugby league footballer of the 1940s and 1950s

Vessels
, a Liberty ship